Alex Norris is a Canadian municipal politician and incumbent city councillor for the Jeanne-Mance district in Le Plateau Mont-Royal borough in Montreal. He is a member of the Projet Montréal municipal party.

A former reporter, researcher and journalist, Norris has become, since first elected in 2009, a local voice against corruption and in favor of transparency at the Montreal City Hall. He has initiated reforms in administrative transparency and has led the fight to reduce violence on Saint-Laurent Boulevard. Norris also spoke on behalf of a number of green and traffic initiatives, including improvements to the Rachel Street bike path.

Before embarking on municipal politics, Norris taught journalism abroad as part of an international initiative to fight corruption and also worked for The Montreal Gazette for 16 years.

Electoral record

References

External links
Ville de Montreal portal
Anglophone city councillor from Mile End in hot water for French-only stance

:fr:Alex Norris

Montreal city councillors
21st-century Canadian politicians
People from Le Plateau-Mont-Royal
Living people
Year of birth missing (living people)
Place of birth missing (living people)